Whiteman is a surname. Notable people with the surname include:

Andrew Whiteman, Canadian musician
Kate Whiteman (1945-2009), British food writer
Loyce Whiteman (1913-1989), American singer
Marjorie M. Whiteman (1898–1986), American diplomat and scholar of international law
Paul Whiteman (1890–1967), American swing bandleader
Peter Whiteman (born 1942), British barrister, professor and author
Sam Whiteman (disambiguation), several people
Steve Whiteman (born 1956), American singer
Violet Whiteman (1873 - 1952), English-born New Zealand artist